Peter Alan Williams (born July 10, 1975) is a former American mixed martial arts fighter who fought out of Ken Shamrock's fight team the Lion's Den. Williams was ranked as high as the #6 top Heavyweight fighter in the world as of May 2000. 

He has competed in the KOTC, RINGS, Pancrase and the UFC, and was runner up in the 1996 Pancrase Neo Blood Tournament.

Biography
Williams and Jerry Bohlander were on the same high school wrestling team and Williams had started training at the Lion's Den about a month after Bohlander. Williams' favorite submission hold is the kneebar.

Williams was the winner of the "SuperBrawl 2" tournament in Honolulu, Hawaii. He beat Donald de la Cruz and Joe Charles by strikes and kneebar, respectively.

Fighting in the UFC, Williams defeated former UFC Heavyweight Champion Mark Coleman and met Kevin Randleman at UFC 23 for the UFC Heavyweight Championship after it was vacated by Bas Rutten. Williams lost the bout by judges' decision.

Williams has competed in the RINGS organization in Japan and was the runner up in the 1996 Pancrase Neo Blood Tournament.

Williams fight with Mark Coleman at UFC 17, where he defeated Coleman by a head kick, is recognized in the UFC Hall of Fame in its 2016 Fight Wing class.

Championships and accomplishments
Pancrase Hybrid Wrestling
1996 Neo Blood Tournament Runner Up
Icon Sport
SuperBrawl 2 Heavyweight Tournament Winner
Ultimate Fighting Championship
UFC Hall of Fame (Fight Wing) vs. Mark Coleman at UFC 17

Mixed martial arts record

|-
| Loss
| align=center| 12–6
| Frank Mir
| Submission (inside shoulder lock)
| UFC 36
| 
| align=center| 1
| align=center| 0:46
| Las Vegas, Nevada, United States
| 
|-
| Loss
| align=center| 12–5
| Ricco Rodriguez
| TKO (punches)
| UFC 34
| 
| align=center| 2
| align=center| 4:02
| Las Vegas, Nevada, United States
| 
|-
| Loss
| align=center| 12–4
| Semmy Schilt
| TKO (body kick and punches)
| UFC 31
| 
| align=center| 2
| align=center| 1:28
| Atlantic City, New Jersey, United States
| 
|-
| Win
| align=center| 12–3
| Rick Mathis
| TKO (corner stoppage)
| KOTC 7 - Wet and Wild
| 
| align=center| 1
| align=center| 5:00
| San Jacinto, California, United States
| 
|-
| Win
| align=center| 11–3
| Roger Neff
| KO (punch)
| KOTC 6 - Road Warriors
| 
| align=center| 1
| align=center| 0:06
| Mt. Pleasant, Michigan, United States
| 
|-
| Loss
| align=center| 10–3
| Kevin Randleman
| Decision (unanimous)
| UFC 23
| 
| align=center| 5
| align=center| 5:00
| Urayasu, Japan
| 
|-
| Win
| align=center| 10–2
| Travis Fulton
| Submission (armlock)
| UFC 20
| 
| align=center| 1
| align=center| 6:28
| Birmingham, Alabama, United States
| 
|-
| Win
| align=center| 9–2
| Jason Godsey
| Submission (kneebar)
| UFC 19
| 
| align=center| 1
| align=center| 1:46
| Bay St. Louis, Mississippi, United States
| 
|-
| Loss
| align=center| 8–2
| Tsuyoshi Kohsaka
| Decision
| UFC Brazil
| 
| align=center| 1
| align=center| 15:00
| Sao Paulo, Brazil
| 
|-
| Win
| align=center| 8–1
| Mark Coleman
| KO (head kick)
| UFC 17
| 
| align=center| 2
| align=center| 0:38
| Mobile, Alabama, United States
| 
|-
| Win
| align=center| 7–1
| Scott McMullin
| TKO (punches)
| World Pankration Championships 2
| 
| align=center| 1
| align=center| N/A
| Dallas, Texas, United States
| 
|-
| Win
| align=center| 6–1
| Joop Kasteel
| TKO (knee injury)
| Rings - Extension Fighting 7
| 
| align=center| 1
| align=center| 8:25
| Japan
| 
|-
| Win
| align=center| 5–1
| John Renfroe
| Submission (armbar)
| SuperBrawl 3
| 
| align=center| 1
| align=center| 2:56
| Honolulu, Hawaii, United States
| 
|-
| Win
| align=center| 4–1
| Joe Charles
| Submission (kneebar)
| SuperBrawl 2
| 
| align=center| 1
| align=center| 1:39
| Honolulu, Hawaii, United States
| 
|-
| Win
| align=center| 3–1
| Donald de la Cruz
| TKO (punches)
| SuperBrawl 2
| 
| align=center| 1
| align=center| 6:12
| Honolulu, Hawaii, United States
| 
|-
| Loss
| align=center| 2–1
| Yuki Kondo
| Decision (unanimous)
| Pancrase - 1996 Neo-Blood Tournament, Round 2
| 
| align=center| 1
| align=center| 20:00
| Tokyo, Japan
| 
|-
| Win
| align=center| 2–0
| Osami Shibuya
| Decision (unanimous)
| Pancrase - 1996 Neo-Blood Tournament, Round 2
| 
| align=center| 1
| align=center| 10:00
| Tokyo, Japan
| 
|-
| Win
| align=center| 1–0
| Kiuma Kunioku
| Decision (unanimous)
| Pancrase - 1996 Neo-Blood Tournament, Round 1
| 
| align=center| 1
| align=center| 10:00
| Tokyo, Japan
|

References

External links
 
 

 FCFighter profile

1975 births
Living people
People from San Lorenzo, California
American male mixed martial artists
Mixed martial artists utilizing wrestling
Ultimate Fighting Championship male fighters
American male sport wrestlers
Amateur wrestlers